The Rankine scale is an absolute scale of thermodynamic temperature named after the University of Glasgow engineer and physicist Macquorn Rankine, who proposed it in 1859.

History
Similar to the Kelvin scale, which was first proposed in 1848, zero on the Rankine scale is absolute zero, but a temperature difference of one Rankine degree (°R or °Ra) is defined as equal to one Fahrenheit degree, rather than the Celsius degree used on the Kelvin scale. In converting from kelvin to degrees Rankine, 1 °R =  K or 1 °R = 1.8 K. A temperature of 0 K (−273.15 °C; −459.67 °F) is equal to 0 °R.

Usage
The Rankine scale is still used in engineering systems where heat computations are done using degrees Fahrenheit.

The symbol for degrees Rankine is °R (or °Ra if necessary to distinguish it from the Rømer and Réaumur scales). By analogy with the SI unit, the kelvin, some authors term the unit Rankine, omitting the degree symbol. 

Some temperatures relating the Rankine scale to other temperature scales are shown in the table below.

See also
 Comparison of temperature scales

Notes

References

Bibliography

External links

Scales of temperature
1859 introductions